Valley Falls State Park is a 1,145 acre (4.63 km²) day use facility sited along both banks of the Tygart Valley River.  The park is located about 7 miles (11 km) south of exit 137 of I-79, near Fairmont, West Virginia.

The park's main feature is a half-mile long set of cascades — the "Valley Falls" — that separate Marion and Taylor County, West Virginia. The park and river provide a popular and risky kayaking run.

Although the falls are an inviting spot, swimming is not allowed. 

Local tradition had it that early settler Jonathan Nixon, Sr (1753-1799) was the first white man to look upon the falls. In the 19th century a small community thrived along the river at the current state park's location. The ruins of a sawmill and a gristmill are still visible along the river.

Features
 Mountain Biking
 Hiking trails 
 Playground
 Picnic area
 Volleyball court
 Fishing
 Kayaking

See also

List of West Virginia state parks 
state park

References

External links
 

Protected areas of Marion County, West Virginia
Protected areas of Taylor County, West Virginia
State parks of West Virginia
Waterfalls of West Virginia
Protected areas established in 1964
Landforms of Marion County, West Virginia
Landforms of Taylor County, West Virginia
1964 establishments in West Virginia
IUCN Category III